Republican Rescue: Saving the Party from Truth Deniers, Conspiracy Theorists, and the Dangerous Policies of Joe Biden is a 2021 book by American politician Chris Christie. The book focuses on conspiracy theories in the United States, moving on beyond former president Donald Trump, president Joe Biden's policies, and rescuing the Republican Party. The book sold fewer than 2,500 copies in the first week of its release.

In the book Christie addresses different conspiracy theories, including one Trump often touts: that the 2020 election was "stolen"; Christie stated the 2020 election was in fact not stolen. In an interview, Nicolle Wallace criticized Christie for not including a critique of Fox News in his book.

Christie was interviewed on NPR by host Don Gonyea for its release.

Reception
The book was termed a "colossal flop" by Press Run, having sold 2,289 copies in the first week of its release.

Insider NJ columnist Fred Snowflack stated, "Political junkies in New Jersey will enjoy reading this book, but the key question remains. Do a majority of Republicans really want to move on from Donald Trump? As Christie puts it, look forward, not backward. As of now, that seems doubtful."

References

2021 non-fiction books
Books about politics of the United States
Chris Christie
Threshold Editions books